Andreas Löbmann (born 20 February 1963) is a German former professional footballer who played as a forward.

References

1963 births
Living people
German footballers
Association football forwards
2. Bundesliga players
Swiss Super League players
TSV 1860 Munich players
FC Wettingen players
BSC Young Boys players
SpVg Blau-Weiß 90 Berlin players
German expatriate footballers
German expatriate sportspeople in Switzerland
Expatriate footballers in Switzerland